Come Holy Spirit may refer to:

 Come, Holy Spirit, a Roman Catholic prayer
 Come Holy Spirit (book), a book by Bishop David Pytches